Daniele Alexander (born December 2, 1954, in Fort Worth, Texas) is an American country music singer. She began her career as a teenager, performing jazz initially before moving to Las Vegas, Nevada to sing in casinos. She also charted in the Top 20 on the Billboard charts with the single "She's There", a single from her 1989 Mercury Records album First Move. In 1990, she was nominated for Top New Female Vocalist at the Academy of Country Music Awards, along with Jann Browne and Mary Chapin Carpenter, but lost to Carpenter. A second album, I Dream in Color, produced a duet with labelmate Butch Baker in "It Wasn't You, It Wasn't Me," the last chart single for either artist. Alexander exited Mercury in 1991, and later co-wrote two songs on Mila Mason's 1997 debut That's Enough of That.

Discography

Albums

Singles

Music videos

References

1954 births
Living people
People from Fort Worth, Texas
American country pianists
American women country singers
American country singer-songwriters
Country musicians from Texas
Mercury Records artists
Singer-songwriters from Texas
20th-century American women pianists
20th-century American pianists
20th-century American women singers
21st-century American women pianists
21st-century American pianists
21st-century American women singers
21st-century American singers
20th-century American singers